The Vongvanij family is a Thai Chinese family. The family was founded by Luan Vongvanij, a Hainanese immigrant who settled in Siam in 1903 at the age of twelve. In 1928 he acquired the British Dispensary, a pharmaceutical company which continues to be owned by the family. The company passed onto his sons Boonchit and Boonyong in 1963 and from Boonyong to his son Anurut in 1993.

Notable people with the surname Vongvanij include:
Arnond Vongvanij, Thai golfer

References

Thai Chinese families